Rongsharia is a genus of harvestmen in the family Sclerosomatidae from Nepal.

Species
 Rongsharia dhaulagirica J. Martens, 1982
 Rongsharia dispersa J. Martens, 1982
 Rongsharia singularis Roewer, 1957

References

Harvestmen
Harvestman genera